The North Midlands Helicopter Support Unit was a joint consortium established in 1998 to provide police aviation for Derbyshire Constabulary and Nottinghamshire Police. It was managed by John Jameson and operated a Eurocopter EC135 from Derbyshire Constabulary's headquarters in Ripley, Derbyshire. 

Operations of the unit were taken over by the National Police Air Service (NPAS) in 2013.  NPAS closed the unit in early 2016.

Aircraft

The first aircraft operated by the unit was G-NMHS, a Eurocopter AS355 Écureuil 2 'Twin Squirrel'.  This aircraft served with the unit from 1998 to 2004 when it was replaced by G-NMID, a Eurocopter EC135 T2.

Following the takeover of operations by NPAS G-NMID remained at the base until closure.  It has since been refurbished and re-registered as G-POLD by NPAS.

See also
 Police aviation
 Police aviation in the United Kingdom

References

Police aviation units of the United Kingdom
Defunct organisations based in the United Kingdom
1998 establishments in England
2016 disestablishments in England